The World Gliding Championships (WGC) is a gliding competition held every two years or so by the FAI Gliding Commission. The dates are not always exactly two years apart, often because the contests are always held in the summer in either the Southern Hemisphere or Northern Hemisphere.

History
Gliding had been a demonstration sport at the 1936 Summer Olympics and was due to become an official Olympic sport in the Helsinki Games in 1940. However, since the Second World War, gliding has not featured in the Olympics, and so the World Championships are the highest level in the sport. There are now contests for six classes of glider and so in recent years the Championships have been divided between two locations. The women's, junior, grand prix and aerobatic events are also held separately.

Each of the following entries give the year and location of the contest followed by the winner of each class, nationality and the glider used.

A list of future events is available here

World Grand Prix Gliding Championships

Gliding Grand Prix, or Sailplane Grand Prix (SGP), is a newer type of gliding competition. It has simpler rules and a more spectacular appearance than conventional soaring competitions.

Women's World Gliding Championships

The Women's World Gliding Championships (WWGC) is a women-only gliding competition. From 1979 to 1999 women's gliding competitions were held as International European Women's Gliding Championships.

Junior World Gliding Championships

The Junior World Gliding Championships (JWGC) is a competition for glider pilots under the age of 26. From 1991 to 1997, international junior gliding competitions were held as European Junior Gliding Championships.

FAI World Glider Aerobatic Championships

World Glider Aerobatic Championships take place each year (every two years until 2011) since 1985 under the auspices of the FAI. They are administrated by the FAI Aerobatics Commission "Commission Internationale de Voltige Aerienne" (CIVA). The 2001 championships were part of the World Air Games. Since 1994, European Glider Aerobatic Championships are held in the years between the World Championships. Since 2010, an additional event is organized in a slightly less demanding "Advanced" category – the World Advanced Glider Aerobatic Championships (WAGAC). WAGAC is organized yearly, usually accompanying the WGAC.

 1st FAI World Glider Aerobatic Championships, Mauterndorf, Austria, 26 August – 3 September 1985
 individual results:
 Jerzy Makula (Poland) glider: Kobuz 3
 Ludwig Fuß (Federal Republic of Germany), glider: Lo 100
 Marek Szufa (Poland) glider: Kobuz 3
 team winners:
 : Jerzy Makula (Kobuz 3), Marek Szufa (Kobuz 3), Marian Bednorz
 : Ludwig Fuß (Lo 100), Helmut Laurson (Lo 100a), Josef Eberl (Lo 100)
 : Siegfried Duchkowitsch, Reinhard Haggenmüller, Otto Salzinger
 2nd FAI World Glider Aerobatic Championships, Bielsko-Biała, Poland, 1–15 August 1987
 individual results:
 Jerzy Makula (Poland), glider: Kobuz 3
 Andrzej Tomkowicz (Poland), glider: Kobuz 3
 Nancy Blank (United States of America) glider: Kobuz 3
 team winners:
 : Jerzy Makula (Kobuz 3), Andrzej Tomkowicz (Kobuz 3), ...
 
 
 3rd FAI World Glider Aerobatic Championships, Hockenheim, Federal Republic of Germany, 15–26 August 1989
 individual results:
 Jerzy Makula (Poland), glider: Kobuz 3
 Andrzej Jozef Solski (Poland), glider: Kobuz 3
 Hubert Jänsch (Federal Republic of Germany), glider: Lo 100
 team winners:
 : Jerzy Makula (Kobuz 3), Jozef Solski (Kobuz 3), ...
 : Hubert Jänsch (Lo 100), ...
 : Walter Martig (LO 100), Peter Gafner (LO 100), Franz Studer (LO 100)
 4th FAI World Glider Aerobatic Championships, Zielona Góra, Poland, 18–31 August 1991
 individual results:
 Jerzy Makula (Poland), glider: Swift S-1
 Tadeusz Mezyk (Poland), glider: Swift S-1
 Marek Hernik (Poland), glider: Swift S-1
 team winners:
 : Jerzy Makula (Swift S-1), Tadeusz Mezyk (Swift S-1), Marek Hernik (Swift S-1)
 : Martin Scheuermann (Mü 28), Hubert Jänsch (Lo 100), Konrad Huber (Lo 100)
 : Stephen Coan (Windex 1200), Charles Kalko (Celstar GA-1), Chris Smisson (Celstar GA-1)
 5th FAI World Glider Aerobatic Championships, Venlo, the Netherlands, 15–28 August 1993
 individual results:
 Jerzy Makula (Poland)
 Adam Michałowski (Poland)
 Tadeusz Mezyk (Poland)
 team winners:
 : Jerzy Makula, Adam Michałowski, Tadeusz Mezyk
 : Sándor Katona, Pierre Albertini, Daniel Serres
 : Hubert Jänsch, Ulf Kramer, Henry Bohlig
 6th FAI World Glider Aerobatic Championships, Fayence, Var, France, 11–23 September 1995
 individual results:
 Mikhail Mamistov (Russia), glider: Swift S-1
 Jerzy Makula (Poland), glider: MDM-1 Fox
 Sergey Rakhmanin (Russia), glider: Swift S-1
 team winners:
 : Mikhail Mamistov (Swift S-1), Sergey Rakhmanin (Swift S-1), Victor Tchmal (Swift S-1)
 : Jerzy Makula (MDM-1 Fox), Andrzej Tomkowicz (Swift S-1), Marek Hernik (MDM-1 Fox)
 : Daniel Serres (Swift S-1), Etienne Meyrous (Swift S-1), Pierre Albertini (Swift S-1)
 7th FAI World Glider Aerobatic Championships, Antalya, Turkey, 9–21 September 1997
 individual results:
 Mikhail Mamistov (Russia)
 Sergei Krikalev (Russia) – cosmonaut
 Georgij Kaminski (Russia)
 team winners:
 : Mikhail Mamistov, Sergei Krikalev, Georgij Kaminski
 8th FAI World Glider Aerobatic Championships, Niederöblarn, Austria, 15–28 August 1999
 individual results:
 Jerzy Makula (Poland), glider: MDM-1 Fox
 Henry Bohlig (Germany), glider: Swift S-1
 Krzystof Brzakalik (Poland), glider: Swift S-1
 team winners:
 : Jerzy Makula (MDM-1 Fox), Krzysztof Brząkalik (Swift S-1), Adam Michałowski (Swift S-1)
 : Henry Bohlig (Swift S-1), Helmut Lindner (Swift S-1), Detlef Eilers (Swift S-1)
 : Valentin Barabanov (Swift S-1), Georgij Kaminski (Swift S-1), Alexandr Panfierov (Swift S-1)
 9th FAI World Glider Aerobatic Championships and 2nd World Air Games Glider Aerobatics Championships, Palma del Río, Córdoba, Spain, 19 June – 1 July 2001
 individual results:
 Alexandr Panfierov (Russia)
 Jerzy Makula (Poland)
  Adam Michałowski (Poland)
 team winners:
 : Jerzy Makula, Adam Michałowski, Małgorzata Margańska
 : Alexandr Panfierov, Valentin Barabanov, Georgij Kaminski
 : Ferenc Tóth, János Szilágyi, Sándor Katona
 10th FAI World Glider Aerobatic Championships, Pér, Hungary, 2–15 August 2003
 individual results:
 Ferenc Tóth (Hungary), glider: Swift S-1
 Jerzy Makula (Poland), glider: MDM-1 Fox
 Georgij Kaminski (Russia), glider: Swift S-1
 team winners:
 : Jerzy Makula (MDM-1 Fox), Krzysztof Brząkalik (Swift S-1), Lucjan Fizia (Swift S-1)
 : Georgij Kaminski (Swift S-1), Alexandr Panfierov (Swift S-1), Alexandr Smirnov (Swift S-1)
 : Ferenc Tóth (Swift S-1), Sándor Katona (Swift S-1), János Szilágyi (Swift S-1)
 11th FAI World Glider Aerobatic Championships, Serpuchov, Russia, 20–30 July 2005
 individual results:
 Georgij Kaminski (Russia)
 Jerzy Makula (Poland)
 Ferenc Tóth (Hungary)
 team winners:
 : Georgij Kaminski, Alexandr Panfierov, Valentin Barabanov
 : Jerzy Makula, Krzysztof Brząkalik, Stanisław Makula
 : Ferenc Tóth, János Szilágyi, Sándor Katona
 12th FAI World Glider Aerobatic Championships, Niederöblarn, Austria, 16–25 August 2007
 individual results:
 Georgij Kaminski (Russia), glider: Swift S-1
 Ferenc Tóth (Hungary), glider: Swift S-1
 Jerzy Makula (Poland), glider: Solo-Fox
 team winners:
 : Ferenc Tóth (Swift S-1), János Szilágyi (Swift S-1), Zoltán Kakuk (Swift S-1)
 : Olaf Schmidt (Swift S-1), Markus Feyerabend (Swift S-1), Eugen Schaal (MDM-1 Fox)
 : Georgij Kaminski (Swift S-1), Igor Plakhsin (Swift S-1), Olga Romanenko (Swift S-1)
 13th FAI World Glider Aerobatic Championships, Hosín, Czech Republic, 10 July 2009 – 19 July 2009
 individual results:
 Georgij Kaminski (Russia), glider: Swift S-1
 Erik Piriou (France), glider: Swift S-1
 Jan Rozlivka (Czech Republic), glider: Swift S-1
 team winners:
 : Erik Piriou (Swift S-1), Daniel Serres (Swift S-1), Jean-Christophe Beaumier (Swift S-1)
 : Jan Rozlivka (Swift S-1), Přemysl Vávra (Swift S-1), Miroslav Červenka (Swift S-1)
 : Eugen Schaal (MDM-1 Fox), Olaf Schmidt (Swift S-1), Gerhard Teichmann (Swift S-1)
 1st FAI World Advanced Glider Aerobatic Championships, Jämijärvi, Finland, 17–24 July 2010.
 individual results:
 Johan Gustafsson (Sweden), glider: Pilatus B-4
 Michael Spitzer (Germany), glider: MDM-1 Fox
 Jochen Reuter (Germany), glider: MDM-1 Fox
 team winners:
 : Michael Spitzer (MDM-1 Fox), Jochen Reuter (MDM-1 Fox), Sebastian Dirlam (MDM-1 Fox)
 : Johan Gustafsson (Pilatus B4), Daniel Ahlin (MDM-1 Fox), Pekka Havbrandt (MDM-1 Fox)
 : Petr Biskup (MDM-1 Fox), Miloš Ramert (MDM-1 Fox), Jan Rolinek (MDM-1 Fox)
 14th FAI World Glider Aerobatic Championships (Unlimited) and 2nd FAI World Advanced Glider Aerobatic Championships (Advanced), Toruń, Poland, 26 July 2011 – 7 August 2011
 Unlimited category
 individual results:
 Jerzy Makula (Poland), glider: Solo-Fox
 Georgij Kaminski (Russia), glider: Swift S-1
 Erik Piriou (France), glider: Swift S-1
 team winners:
 : Jerzy Makula (Solo-Fox), Maciej Pospieszyński (Swift S-1), Stanisław Makula (Solo-Fox)
 : Erik Piriou (Swift S-1), Daniel Serres (Swift S-1), Pierre Albertini (Swift S-1)
 : Georgij Kaminski (Swift S-1), Vladimir Ilinski (Swift S-1), Igor Plaksin (Swift S-1)
 Advanced category
 individual results:
 Benoit Merieau (France), glider: Swift S-1
 Luca Bertossio (Italy), glider: Swift S-1
 Aurelien Durgineux (France), glider: Swift S-1
 team winners:
 : David Friedrich (Swift S-1), Jochen Reuter (MDM-1 Fox), Michael Spitzer (MDM-1 Fox)
 : Benoit Merieau (Swift S-1), Aurelien Durgineux (Swift S-1), Daniel Devillers (Swift S-1)
 : Daniel Ahlin (MDM-1 Fox), Johan Gustafsson (Pilatus B-4), Pekka Havbrandt (MDM-1 Fox)
 15th FAI World Glider Aerobatic Championships (Unlimited) and 3rd FAI World Advanced Glider Aerobatic Championships (Advanced), Dubnica, Slovakia, 9 August 2012 – 18 August 2012
 Unlimited category
 individual results:
 : Maciej Pospieszyński, glider: Swift S-1
 : Ferenc Tóth, glider: Swift S-1
 : Markus Feyerabend, glider: Swift S-1
 Advanced category
 individual results:
 : Luca Bertossio, glider: Swift S-1
 : Marcello Tedeschi, glider: Swift S-1
 : Sasa Marvin, glider: Swift S-1
 team results:
 : Luca Bertossio (Swift S-1), Marcello Tedeschi (Swift S-1), Sasa Marvin (Swift S-1)
 : Nicolas Soehner (MDM-1 Fox), Eberhard Holl (MDM-1 Fox), Dirk Maslonka (MDM-1 Fox)
 : Magdalena Stróżyk (Solo Fox), Katarzyna Żmudzińska (MDM-1 Fox), Sławomir Talowski (Swift S-1)

 16th FAI World Glider Aerobatic Championships (Unlimited) and 4th World Advanced Glider Aerobatic Championships (Advanced), Oripää Airfield, Oripää, Finland, 18–27 July 2013
 Unlimited category
 individual results:
 : Vladmir Ilyinski, glider: Swift S-1
 : Georgij Kaminski, glider: Swift S-1
 : Maciej Pospieszyński, glider: Swift S-1
 team winners:
 
 
 
 Advanced category
 individual results:
 : Johan Gustafsson, glider: SZD-59 Acro
 : Sławomir Talowski, glider: Swift S-1
 : Daniel Ahlin, glider: Salto
 team results:
 : Sławomir Talowski (Swift S-1), Katarzyna Żmudzinska (Swift S-1), Magdalena Stróżyk (Swift S-1)
 : Michal Čechmánek (Swift S-1), Ivo Červinka (Swift S-1), Jan Rolinek (Swift S-1)
 : Sasha Marvin (Swift S-1), Pietro Filippini (Swift S-1), Lapo Simone Dressino (Swift S-1)
 17th FAI World Glider Aerobatic Championships (Unlimited category) and 5th World Advanced Glider Aerobatic Championships (Advanced category) Toruń Airfield, Toruń, Poland, July 22 – August 2, 2014.
 Unlimited category
 individual results:
 : Maciej Pospieszyński, glider: Swift S-1
 : Ferenc Tóth, glider: Swift S-1
 : Georgij Kaminski, glider: Swift S-1
 team winners:
 : Přemysl Vávra, Jan Rozlivka, Jan Rolinek
 : Maciej Pospieszyński, Jerzy Makula, Tomasz Kaczmarczyk
 : Georgy Kaminskiy, Valeriy Korchagin, Vladimir Ilinskiy
 Advanced category
 individual results:
 : Romain Vienne, glider: Swift S-1
 : Katarzyna Żmudzińska, glider: Swift S-1
 : Sławomir Talowski, glider: Swift S-1
 team results:
 : Katarzyna Żmudzinska, Sławomir Talowski, Michał Klimaszewski
 : Romain Vienne, Benoit Madrenas, Ervin George
 : Markus Pönicke, Andreas Rodewald, Eberhard Holl
 18th FAI World Glider Aerobatic Championships (Unlimited category) and 6th World Advanced Glider Aerobatic Championships (Advanced category), August 5–15, 2015, Zbraslavice Airport, Czech Republic.
 Unlimited category
 individual results:
 : Ferenc Tóth, glider: Swift S-1
 : Luca Bertossio, glider: Swift S-1
 : Eugen Schaal, glider: Swift S-1
 team winners:
 : Přemysl Vávra, Miroslav Červenka, Lucie Pešková
 : Eugen Schaal, Markus Feyerabend, Gisbert Leimkühler
 : Maciej Pospieszyński, Jerzy Makula, Magdalene Stróžyk
 Advanced category
 individual results:
 : Miroslav Černý, glider: Swift S-1
 : Sławomir Talowski, glider: Swift S-1
 : Jonas Langenegger, glider: MDM-1 Fox
 team results:
 : Sławomir Talowski, Katarzyna Zmudziňska, Michał Andrzejewski
 : Miroslav Černý, David Beneš, Martin Meloun
 : Jonas Langenegger, Manfred Echter, Martin Götz
 (NEEDS CORRECTION! 19th WGAC was in Hungary in 2016, results are missing) 20th FAI World Glider Aerobatic Championships (Unlimited category) and 8th World Advanced Glider Aerobatic Championships (Advanced category), July 27 – August 5, 2017, Toruń, Poland.
 Unlimited category
 individual results:
 : Ferenc Tóth, glider: Swift S-1
 : János Szilágyi, glider: Swift S-1
 : Luca Bertossio, glider: Swift S-1
 team winners:
 : Ferenc Tóth, János Szilágyi, János Sonkoly
 : Moritz Kirchberg, Eugen Schaal, Marvin Woltering
 : Siegfried Mayr, Gabriel Stangl, Bernhard Behr
 Advanced category
 individual results:
 : Gustav Salminen, glider: MDM-1 Fox
 : Erwin George, glider: Swift S-1
 : Michał Klimaszewski, glider: MDM-1 Fox
 team results:
 : Michał Andrzejewski, Agata Nykaza, Mirosław Wrześniewski
 : Erwin George, Benoît Madrenas, Eric Lanquetin
 : Ciprian Lupaș, Valentin Hota, Gál Zsolt

 21st FAI World Glider Aerobatic Championships (Unlimited category) and 9th World Advanced Glider Aerobatic Championships (Advanced category), August 1 – 11, 2018, Zbraslavice Airport, Czech Republic.
 Unlimited category
 individual results:
 : Ferenc Tóth, glider: Swift S-1
 : Luca Bertossio, glider: Swift S-1
 : Moritz Kirchberg, glider: Swift S-1
 team winners:
 : Moritz Kirchberg, Eugen Schaal, Eberhard Holl
 : Ferenc Tóth, János Szilágyi, János Sonkoly
 : Přemysl Vávra, Miroslav Červenka, Miroslav Černý
 Advanced category
 individual results:
 : Jonas Langenegger, glider: MDM-1 Fox
 : Tomáš Bartoň, glider: Swift S-1
 : Josef Rejent, glider: Swift S-1
 team results:
 : Tomáš Bartoň, Josef Rejent, Aleš Ferra
 : Michał Klimaszewski, Sławomir Cichoń, Wojciech Gałuszka
 : Lorand Daroczi, Octav Alexan, Ciprian Lupaș

 22nd FAI World Glider Aerobatic Championships (Unlimited category) and 10th World Advanced Glider Aerobatic Championships (Advanced category), July 18–26, 2019, Deva, Romania.
 Unlimited category
 individual results:
 : Ferenc Tóth, glider: Swift S-1
 : Eugen Schaal, glider: Swift S-1
 : Michael Spitzer, glider: Swift S-1
 team winners:
 : Eugen Schaal, Michael Spitzer, Tobias Hackel
 : Stanisław Makula, Jan Makula, Piotr Lewandowski
 : Bernhard Behr, Siegfried Mayr, Gabriel Stangl
 Advanced category
 individual results:
 : Patrycja Pacak, glider: Swift S-1
 : Octav Alexan, glider: MDM-1 Fox
 : Charlie Levy-Louapre, glider: MDM-1 Fox
 team results:
 : Octav Alexan, Lorand Daroczi, Ciprian Lupaș
 : Charlie Levy-Louapre, Thibaut Fromantin, Marc de Bouvier
 : Stefan Zistler, Mathias Mühlbacher, David Tempel

 23rd FAI World Glider Aerobatic Championships (Unlimited category) and 11th World Advanced Glider Aerobatic Championships (Advanced category), July 29–August 6, 2021, Leszno, Poland.
 Unlimited category
 individual results:
 : Ferenc Tóth, glider: Swift S-1
 : Luca Bertossio, glider: Swift S-1
 : Vladimir Ilinskiy, glider: Swift S-1
 team winners:
 : Piotr Lewandowski, Jan Makula, Stanisław Makula
 : Benoît Madrenas, Nicolas Honnons, Marc de Bouvier
 : Siegfried Mayr, Bernhard Behr, Jakob Prior
 Advanced category
 individual results:
 : Charlie Levy-Louapre, glider: Swift S-1
 : Maria Gavrilina, glider: Swift S-1
 : Thibaut Fromantin, glider: Swift S-1
 team results:
 : Octav Alexan, Valentin Hoța, Daroczi Lorand
 : Charlie Levy-Louapre, Thibaut Fromantin, Frédéric Durand
 : Sławomir Cichoń, Wojciech Gałuszka, Michał Rumiński

 24th FAI World Glider Aerobatic Championships (Unlimited category) and 12th World Advanced Glider Aerobatic Championships (Advanced category), 18–26 August, 2022, Issoudun, France.
 Unlimited category
 individual results:
 : Ferenc Tóth, glider: Swift S-1
 : Maciej Pospieszyński, glider: Swift S-1
 : Jonas Langenegger, glider: Swift S-1
 team winners:
 : Charlie Levy-Louapre, Marc de Bouvier
 : Maciej Pospieszyński, Michał Klimaszewski
 : Michael Spitzer, Wolfgang Schiek
 Advanced category
 individual results:
 : Oliver Adamy, glider: Swift S-1
 : Thibaut Fromantin, glider: Swift S-1
 : Mirosław Wrześniewski, glider: Swift S-1
 team results:
 : Oliver Adamy, Adam Klenka, Jan Adam
 : Mathias Mühlbacher, Holger Geusen, David Tempel
 : Valentin Hoța, Zsolt Gál, Lorand Daroczi

See also
 European Gliding Championships

References

Sources
Airsports.tv Gliding Channel
Air Sports International (FAI online magazine)
Archive of the US Team
British Gliding Association competitions page

External links
 

Gliding competitions
Gliding
Gliding